In phylogenetics, an apomorphy (or derived trait) is a novel character or character state that has evolved from its ancestral form (or plesiomorphy). A synapomorphy is an apomorphy shared by two or more taxa and is therefore hypothesized to have evolved in their most recent common ancestor. In cladistics, synapomorphy implies homology.

Examples of apomorphy are the presence of erect gait, fur, the evolution of three  middle ear bones, and mammary glands in mammals but not in other vertebrate animals such as amphibians or reptiles, which have retained their ancestral traits of a sprawling gait and lack of fur. Thus, these derived traits are also synapomorphies of mammals in general as they are not shared by other vertebrate animals.

Etymology 

Clade analysis 
The concept of synapomorphy depends on a given clade in the tree of life. Cladograms are diagrams that depict evolutionary relationships within groups of taxa. These illustrations are accurate predictive device in modern genetics. They are usually depicted in either tree or ladder form. Synapomorphies then create evidence for historical relationships and their associated hierarchical structure. Evolutionarily, a synapomorphy is the marker for the most recent common ancestor of the monophyletic group consisting of a set of taxa in a cladogram. What counts as a synapomorphy for one clade may well be a primitive character or plesiomorphy at a less inclusive or nested clade. For example, the presence of mammary glands is a synapomorphy for mammals in relation to tetrapods but is a symplesiomorphy for mammals in relation to one another—rodents and primates, for example. So the concept can be understood as well in terms of "a character newer than" (autapomorphy) and "a character older than" (plesiomorphy) the apomorphy: mammary glands are evolutionarily newer than vertebral column, so mammary glands are an autapomorphy if vertebral column is an apomorphy, but if mammary glands are the apomorphy being considered then vertebral column is a plesiomorphy.

Relations to other terms 
These phylogenetic terms are used to describe different patterns of ancestral and derived character or trait states as stated in the above diagram in association with apomorphies and synapomorphies.
 Symplesiomorphy – an ancestral trait shared by two or more taxa.
 Plesiomorphy – a symplesiomorphy discussed in reference to a more derived state.
 Pseudoplesiomorphy – is a trait that cannot be identified as neither a plesiomorphy nor an apomorphy that is a reversal.
 Reversal – is a loss of derived trait present in ancestor and the reestablishment of a plesiomorphic trait.
 Convergence – independent evolution of a similar trait in two or more taxa.
 Apomorphy – a derived trait. Apomorphy shared by two or more taxa and inherited from a common ancestor is synapomorphy. Apomorphy unique to a given taxon is autapomorphy.
 Synapomorphy/homology – a derived trait that is found in some or all terminal groups of a clade, and inherited from a common ancestor, for which it was an autapomorphy (i.e., not present in its immediate ancestor).
 Underlying synapomorphy – a synapomorphy that has been lost again in many members of the clade. If lost in all but one, it can be hard to distinguish from an autapomorphy.
 Autapomorphy – a distinctive derived trait  that is unique to a given taxon or group.
 Homoplasy in biological systematics is when a trait has been gained or lost independently in separate lineages during evolution. This convergent evolution leads to species independently sharing a trait that is different from the  trait inferred to have been present in their common ancestor.
 Parallel homoplasy –  derived trait present in two groups or species without a common ancestor due to convergent evolution.
 Reverse homoplasy – trait present in an ancestor but not in direct descendants that reappears in later descendants.
 Hemiplasy is the case where a character that appears homoplastic given the species tree actually has a single origin on the associated gene tree. Hemiplasy reflects gene tree-species tree discordance due to the multispecies coalescent.

References

External links 
 Cladistics, Berkeley

Phylogenetics
Evolutionary biology terminology

de:Apomorphie#Unterteilung von Apomorphien